Ruskova is a Russian vodka that is distilled in the region of Nizhniy Novgorod. Ruskova is a product manufactured under 7 Mile Spirits LLC and is owned by an entrepreneur Boris Nikomarov.

Nikomarov has recently announced that Ruskova has gone through a complete label modification and repackaging.

The manufacturer had plans to start selling this vodka in South America, but currently operates throughout the United States and Alaska.

Flavors

 80 Proof (red label)
 Peach
 Orange Pineapple
 Elderflower
 Citron
 Raspberry

References

External links
 Official site

Russian vodkas
Alcoholic drink brands
Russian brands